The Hollywood Heritage Museum, also known as the "Hollywood Studio Museum," is located on Highland Ave. in Hollywood, California, United States.

The museum is opposite the Hollywood Bowl and is housed in the restored Lasky-DeMille Barn, which was acquired in February 1983 by Hollywood Heritage, Inc., and moved to its present site. It was dedicated on December 13, 1985.

Since 1985, Hollywood Heritage has funded the preservation, restoration and maintenance of early Hollywood treasures. The museum features archival photographs from the silent era of motion pictures, movie props, historic documents and other movie related memorabilia. Also featured are historic photographs and postcards of the streets, buildings and residences of Hollywood during its golden age. Special events entitled 'Evenings at the Barn' are open to the public and regularly programmed including speakers, screenings and/or slideshows with a focus toward Hollywood's early history. Occasionally, historic silent films are screened in cooperation with the Silent Society.

Building history

The building which houses the Hollywood Heritage Museum (Lasky-DeMille Barn; known from 1985 to 2003 as The Hollywood Studio Museum) was built in 1901 as a stable by the landowner, Col. Robert Northam, whose estate extended to both sides of Vine Street, the East side beginning at Selma and extending down to Sunset. A few other individually owned parcels were also contained within the eastern block. Col. Northam's home was on the West side, where the Hollywood Plaza Hotel is currently located. Col. Northam sold the property in 1903 to Jacob Stern, a realtor interested in the then-booming Hollywood real estate market. Hollywood became a city that year and the prohibitionist sentiments of the populace also made it illegal to show movies in Hollywood. Hollywood merged with the City of Los Angeles in 1910, and in October 1911, the first movie studio was located in the former Blondeau Tavern at Sunset Blvd. and Gower St. The Stern barn became the 2nd studio following the establishment of the Burns and Revier Company in May 1912. Louis Loss Burns (founder of Western Costume Company) and Harry Revier rented the barn from Mr. Stern sometime before May 1912, as a building permit to create an office within the barn was issued in May 1912. The Burns and Revier had the advantage of having a laboratory on the lot; it was renamed the Burns and Revier Studio and Laboratory. The barn structure was used for dressing rooms and editing rooms, while the office served the heads of the company.

In December 1913, Cecil B. DeMille, as a partner in the newly formed Jesse L. Lasky Feature Play Company, which consisted of Mr. Lasky, DeMille and Mr. Lasky's brother in law, Samuel Goldwyn, traveled to California and met Mssrs. Burns and Revier at the Alexandria Hotel in downtown Los Angeles. They drove Mr. DeMille to the studio and on December 22, a lease agreement between the three parties was executed on Hotel Alexandria stationery, followed by a second agreement between Jacob Stern and DeMille allowing them to sublease the Burns and Revier Studio. They leased the barn and studio facilities for $250.00 a month  establishing the Jesse L. Lasky Feature Play Company and began production of The Squaw Man (February 14, 1914), the first feature film to be produced in the Hollywood area. At the same time, DeMille bought out the interests of Burns and Revier and entered into lease extensions with Mr. Stern.

In 1916, the Lasky Company merged with Adolph Zukor's Famous Players to become The Famous Players - Lasky Corporation, and in 1917 merged with Paramount Distributing Company and would in time, become Paramount Pictures Corporation. In 1926, the company moved from the two square city block lot that had grown from the small barn, to a larger site composed of the former Brunton, Peralta, and United Studios on Melrose Ave., where Paramount Studio remains. The sentimental founders moved the barn to the new lot with them; it went through several uses as a film set, research library, conference area and later the Paramount gymnasium (1929). It remained as the gym until 1979. It was moved to a couple of different locations on the Paramount lot, its last location being adjacent to Cecil B. DeMille's office and becoming an integral part of Paramount's Western Street backlot. The barn is visible in a number of movies including "The Rainmaker" and in series such as "Bonanza."

In a ceremony attended by its founders, the Lasky-DeMille Barn was dedicated on December 27, 1956, as "Hollywood's First Major Film Company Studio" and designated California State Historic Landmark No. 554, representing the birth of the Hollywood motion picture industry and becoming the first landmark associated with it.

In 1979 Paramount donated the building to the Hollywood Chamber of Commerce's Hollywood Historic Trust and was moved to a parking lot on the West side of Vine Street. It remained there until the Chamber and Paramount redonated it Hollywood Heritage in 1983. It was then moved by the Hollywood Chamber of Commerce to the parking lot of The Hollywood Palace theater, where it was boarded up and fenced in until a permanent site could be found.

Hollywood Heritage had the barn moved to its current location since that was land designated in 1960 for a film museum that was not built, but which had received a good deal of publicity for a former marine who resisted moving from his home, fearing a museum would never be built. The building was moved to the Highland Ave. site in February 1982 and the following three years were spent in restoring the building with donated goods and services and with volunteer labor. 2015 will mark the 30th anniversary of the museum, making it one of the longest operating film museums internationally. It was closed from 1997 to 2003 due to a fire, which although damaging a small portion of the building, did not damage any part of the museum's permanent collection.

The Lasky DeMille barn was registered as a California State Historic Landmark in 1955 and was placed on the National Register of Historic Places in 2013, 100 years after the arrival of Lasky and DeMille.

The museum is owned and operated by Hollywood Heritage, Inc. a California State non-profit founded in 1980 by Marian Gibbons, Christy Johnson McAvoy, Frances Offenhauser McKeal, and Susan Peterson St. Francis, and was located at its current site through the efforts of Former Los Angeles County Supervisors, John Anson Ford and Edmund D. Edelman.

California Historical Landmark Marker
California Historical Landmark Marker NO. 554 the site reads:
NO. 554 CECIL B. DeMILLE STUDIO BARN - Cecil B. DeMille rented half of this structure, then used as a barn, as the studio in which was made the first feature-length motion picture in Hollywood-The Squaw Man-in 1913. Associated with Mr. DeMille in making The Squaw Man were Samuel Goldwyn and Jesse Lasky, Sr. Originally located at the corner of Selma and Vine Streets, in 1927 the barn was transferred to Paramount Studios.

References

External links 

Official Hollywood Heritage Museum website

AFI entry for The Squaw Man
IMDb entry for The Squaw Man
The Story of the Lasky-DeMille Barn by Allan Ellenberger on Dec 22nd, 2013

Cinema museums in California
Buildings and structures in Hollywood, Los Angeles
Museums in Los Angeles
History museums in Hollywood, Los Angeles
Media museums in California
Cinema of Southern California
Museums established in 1985
1985 establishments in California